The men's 200 metres was a track and field athletics event held as part of the Athletics at the 1904 Summer Olympics programme. It was the second time the 200 metres was contested. All races of this competition was held on a straight course. 5 athletes from 2 nations participated. The competition was held on August 31, 1904. The United States swept the medals, with Archie Hahn earning the second of his three sprint medals in St. Louis. Nathaniel Cartmell took silver and William Hogenson earned bronze. It was the second consecutive American victory in the event.

Background

This was the second appearance of the event, which was not held at the first Olympics in 1896 but has been on the program ever since. None of the runners from the 1900 Games returned. The favorite was Archie Hahn, who had already won the 60 metres and was attempting to triple in the sprint events with the 100 metres held a few days later. All five of the runners had been in the top 8 of the 60 metres.

Canada made its debut in the event. The United States made its second appearance, the only nation to have competed at both of the first two 200 metres races.

Competition format

There were two rounds, semifinals and a final. The top two runners in each of the two semifinals advanced to the final. The track was a -mile cinder track with one straightaway longer than the other three straights.

Records

These were the standing world and Olympic records (in seconds) prior to the 1904 Summer Olympics.

* unofficial 220 yards (= 201.17 m)

** This track was 500 metres in circumference.

Archie Hahn at first equalized the standing Olympic record in the first heat. In the final he set a new Olympic record with 21.6 seconds.

Schedule

Results

Semifinals

The top two finishers in each heat advanced to the final.

Semifinal 1

Semifinal 2

Final

Cartmell, Hogenson, and Moulton were all penalized one yard for false starts. Hahn lead from the start, with Cartmell well behind within the first 20 metres. Cartmell began to gain on the field after 75 metres, catching Moulton and Hogenson but not Hahn.

Results summary

References

Sources

 

Athletics at the 1904 Summer Olympics
200 metres at the Olympics